The Delhi Aerocity Metro Station is located on the Delhi Airport Express Line of the Delhi Metro. This station is located near the NH-8 highway. While the Airport Express Line was opened on 23 February 2011, this station was not opened to the public until Independence Day, Monday 15 August 2011, to allow a buildup of demand.

The metro station was constructed to connect Delhi Metro with Aerocity, a part of Indira Gandhi International Airport, ultimately housing 16 luxury hotels and commercial spaces. It was conceived and approved as a part of the Delhi Airport master plan. The hospitality district of Aerocity offers quick access to the airport, besides being centrally located between the business areas of Delhi and Gurgaon.

The station is within walking distance to Mahipalpur, New Delhi, situated at Delhi–Gurgaon border.

Station layout

See also
List of Delhi Metro stations
Transport in Delhi
Delhi Metro Rail Corporation
Delhi Suburban Railway

References

External links
 Delhi Metro Rail Corporation Ltd. (Official site)
 Delhi Metro Annual Reports
 
 UrbanRail.Net – descriptions of all metro systems in the world, each with a schematic map showing all stations.

Delhi Metro stations
Railway stations in India opened in 2011
Railway stations in South West Delhi district